Igal Lichtman (also known by the Internet pseudonym "Mrs. Jello") was the founder, chairman and chief executive officer (CEO) of Magic Solutions International, Inc., a company that specializes in help desk and asset management software. Lichtman was also a seed investor in targeted advertising network Quigo, which was sold to America Online in 2007 for US$340 million.

Biography
Lichtman earned a Bachelor of Science in Electrical Engineering (BSEE) from Technion, the Israeli Institute of Technology, and then held various positions as both an engineer and a programmer. Lichtman also served as an officer in the Israeli Air Force.

Lichtman was a co-founder of a prosperous computer/local area network (LAN) value-added reseller (VAR) business that achieved recognition in a list of the top 100 LAN VAR's in the U.S. between 1986 and 1988.

Magic Solutions
Founded by Lichtman in 1988 and headquartered in Paramus, New Jersey, United States (U.S.), Magic Solutions International, Inc. (known as "Magic Solutions") was a company that specialized in help desk automation and asset management software. The company emerged as an unplanned spin-off from a computer systems integrator, and was later considered one of the most successful independent software vendors on the East Coast of the U.S. during the 1990s.

At inception, the company consisted of a single programmer in the service of one customer. At its height, Magic Solutions consisted of 300 employees, a base of 6,000 customers, and  an annual trailing sales worth over US$50 million. In 1996 and 1997, Magic Solutions was among the INC 500's fastest growing companies in the U.S., and in April 1998 was acquired by Network Associates Inc. (NETA) (McAfee Inc, as of July 2004) for US$110 million.

In 1997, search technology that Magic Solutions created was licensed to Microsoft for use in the "TechNet" product.

Post-Magic Solutions
After the sale of Magic Solutions, Lichtman built and funded a number of high-technology startup companies, including iBoogie.com, TrafficMedia (responsible for the "Vortalizer Technology" innovation), Quigo.com, and Domainspa.com (an early example of the "pay per click" internet advertising business model).

During this period, Lichtman also worked in the area of virtual reality and produced the website Jerusalem.com, where visitors adopt an avatar to navigate through a virtual tour of Jerusalem.

Charity work
Lichtman's charity work included board membership for the Friends of the Israel Defense Forces, and the endowment of a wing to the Israel National Museum of Science, Technology, and Space (also known as "MadaTech").

Awards
In 1996, Lichtman was awarded the Ernst & Young Entrepreneur of the Year Award for New Jersey in the "Software" category, and Magic Solutions ranked No. 238 in the 1996 INC 500 after growth of more than 1,000 percent was recorded over five years.

Death
Lichtman died on February 18, 2013, due to complications from cancer.

References

American technology chief executives
2013 deaths
Technion – Israel Institute of Technology alumni